Yelinskaya is a rural locality (a village) in Kemskoye Rural Settlement, Vytegorsky District, Vologda Oblast, Russia. The population was 42 as of 2002.

Geography 
Yelinskaya is located 99 km southeast of Vytegra (the district's administrative centre) by road. Deminskaya is the nearest rural locality.

References 

Rural localities in Vytegorsky District